Ahmadjan Khasan (born 2 June 1957) is a former Afghanistan wrestler, who competed at the 1980 Summer Olympic Games in the middleweight event.

References

External links
 

Wrestlers at the 1980 Summer Olympics
Afghan male sport wrestlers
Olympic wrestlers of Afghanistan
1957 births
Living people
Place of birth missing (living people)